The following highways are numbered 2N:

United States
 U.S. Route 2N (former)
 New Jersey Route 2N (former)

See also
List of highways numbered 2